Salim Rehman (born 1 January 1967) is a Pakistani politician from Pakistan Tehreek-e-Insaf, who had been a member of the National Assembly of Pakistan from August 2018 till January 2023. 

He successfully won the election of the National Assembly twice on Pakistan Tehreek-e-Insaf's ticket from NA-3 (Swat-II) in August 2018 and 2013 Pakistani general election from NA-30 (Swat-II). He remained a member of the national assembly between June 2013 to May 2018.

Early life
He was born on 1 January 1967.

Political career
Rehman ran for the seat of National Assembly of Pakistan as a candidate of Pakistan Peoples Party (PPP) from Constituency NA-30 (Swat-II) in 2002 Pakistani general election but was unsuccessful. He secured 10,867 votes and lost the seat to a candidate of Muttahida Majlis-e-Amal.

Rehman ran for the seat of National Assembly of Pakistan as a candidate of PPP from Constituency NA-29 (Swat-I) in 2008 Pakistani general election but was unsuccessful, He secured 12,774 votes and lost the seat to a candidate of Awami National Party.

Rehman was elected to the National Assembly as a candidate of Pakistan Tehreek-e-Insaf (PTI) from Constituency NA-30 (Swat-II) in 2013 Pakistani general election. He received 49,976 votes and defeated Amir Muqam.

He was re-elected to the National Assembly as a candidate of PTI from Constituency NA-3 (Swat-II) in 2018 Pakistani general election. He received 68,162 votes and defeated Shehbaz Sharif.

References

Living people
Pakistan Tehreek-e-Insaf politicians
Pashtun people
Pakistani MNAs 2013–2018
1967 births
Pakistani MNAs 2018–2023
Pakistan Tehreek-e-Insaf MNAs